Power and dominance-submission are two key dimensions of relationships, especially close relationships in which parties rely on one another to achieve their goals and as such it is important to be able to identify indicators of dominance.

Power is the ability to influence behavior and may not be fully assessable until it is challenged with equal force. Unlike power, which can be latent, dominance is a manifest condition characterized by individual, situational and relationship patterns in which attempts to control another party or parties may or may not be accepted.  Moskowitz, Suh, and Desaulniers (1994) describe two similar ways that people can relate to society as parties to interpersonal relationships: agency and communion. Agency includes status and is on a continuum from assertiveness-dominance to passive-submissiveness; it can be measured by subtracting submissiveness from dominance. Communion includes love and falls on a continuum from warm-agreeable to cold-hostile-quarrelsome. Those with the greatest and least power typically do not assert dominance while those with more equal relationships make more control attempts.

Power and dominance are closely related concepts that greatly impact relationships. In order to understand how dominance captures relationships one must understand the influence of gender and social roles while watching for verbal and nonverbal indicators of dominance.

Individuals may dominate through strategies that is a modifier of the function of others in the group, modifying the on-going social dynamics:
1. Restrict or have preferential treatment to what amounts one can access the food, potential and actual mates, territory, resting and sleeping areas, and the locations for that group that's most protected from predators; 2. The movements of others; or 3. How the attention of others can be utilized, an idea put forth by Michael Chance and Ray Larsen. Through the generations there are allotted hierarchy legitimizing myths by the power structure which suggests what beliefs and attitudes are permissible which determines whom deserves their status and for what reasons. That in effect is the dominant groups who have a favorable position get to have the final say on why subordinate groups have the status they do. Attitudes and beliefs are what help determine a dominant group its position rather than merely because its been practiced that way.

Verbal indicators
Verbal indicators influence perceptions of dominance. To date, dominance has been linked to vocal control (Lamb, 1981, as cited in Dunbar and Burgoon, 2005), loudness as measured by amplitude (Burgoon and Hoobler, 2002, as cited in Dunbar and Burgoon, 2005; and Dillard, 2000), pitch as measured by frequency (Burgoon and Hoobler, 2002, as cited in Dunbar and Burgoon, 2005; Dillard, 2000), interruptions (Karawosky et al.., as cited in Youngquist, 2009; Karakowsky, McBey, and Miller, as cited in Youngquist, 2009), disfluencies (Dunbar and Burgoon, 2005), amount of talk time (Burgoon and Hoobler, 2002, as cited in Dunbar and Burgoon, 2005), speech rate or the number of words used in an encounter, and message length (Dunbar and Burgoon, 2005; and Dillard, 2000). An important factor for humans and animals to detect in order to survive is the idea of involvement which can be indicated through change and intensity (Tusing and Dillard, 2000). Vocal characteristics such as amplitude and frequency variation indicate change while speech rate can indicate intensity (Tusing and Dillard, 2000). Those with a high speech rate talk faster and as such are usually perceived as more dominant (Aronvitch; Buller and Aune; Buller and Burgoon; Harrigan et al..; Scherer et al.., as cited in Tusing and Dillard, 2000). Interruptions, vocal control, loudness, pitch, verbosity, speech rate and message length were found to predict perceptions of dominance.

In general, interruptions and perceptions of dominance follows a curvilinear relationship (Dunbar and Burgoon, 2005; Youngquist, 2009). Also, when asked to think of typical behaviors of powerful individuals, Obama, Sydni, and Guy (2006) found that those that were thought to hold more power were also perceived to have more successful interruptions as well as fewer disfluencies. As promised earlier, gender differences exist within interruptions too. Youngquist (2009) chose to look at how dominance as indicated by intrusive interruptions is perceived differently depending on the gender composition of dyads. This was done by asking 378 individuals to listen to one of 4 recordings with 3 subsections, each subsection contained 2 interruptions. The recording was paused after each subsection and assessments were made about dominance. In addition, the conversations varied by gender composition, male/male, female/male, etc. with the same actor making a total of six interruptions within one recording. His findings show that overall, female interrupters in the same sex dyad are perceived as most dominant while male interrupters in a cross sex dyad are perceived as least dominant. This is in contrast to Dunbar and  Burgoon's (2005) finding that men overall are perceived as the most dominant with increased interruptions. Youngquist (2009) additionally finds that females in the same sex groups, who interrupt, are perceived as more dominant than males in the same sex group. Though an interrupter in the same sex group was seen more dominant than the male in the cross sex group, it was only for the first two interruptions. Also, for the first section of the survey (with two interruptions, in the same conversation) but not the second or third sections it was found that the female interrupter, compared to a male interrupter, was seen as more dominant in a cross sex dyad. 
	
Vocal control, loudness, and pitch also have been found to be associated with dominance. Dunbar and Burgoon (2005) had partners and third party observers rate dominance after participating or observing an interaction. Couples were initially separated and asked to write a list of items they would like to spend a hypothetical gift of money on. The couple was then reunited and then asked to jointly decide the top things their money would be spent on. Participants rated their partners' dominance after the interaction while third party observers rated their perceptions during the interaction. They found that observers rated males and females more dominant when they expressed higher vocal control (.76, .70) respectively and only male partners perceived their partner to be more dominant when she had greater vocal control (.23). In an additional experiment, Tusling (2000) used 760 participants and divided them into three groups. Group one watched and listened to a video across various influence goals, while group two was given a transcript of the messages and group three watched the video without sounds. Each group gauged dominance levels using a Likert scale from 1-5. He found that amplitude, a measure of loudness, and amplitude variation, an indicator of change dictated perceptions of dominance. It was also found that frequency, a measure of pitch, and frequency variations were reliable predictors of dominance. Verbosity, speech rate, and message length were all found to be reliable predictors of dominance. Tussling and Dillard (2009) found that slower speech rates were found to predict increased dominance perceptions. Shorter messages were also found to predict dominance.

Nonverbal indicators

Nonverbal communication indicators are most readily located on the face such as Visual Dominance Ratio and indicators expressed through the hands such as adaptor and illustrator gestures have been linked to dominance. An individual's body can indicate dominance as well through posture, elevation, relaxation and body lean. Nonverbal behavioral indicators can be seen in the face through factors like expressiveness, visual dominance ratio, gaze, and emotions, and through the body through body control, posture, lean, openness and gestures. Facial indicators such as expressiveness, visual dominance ratio, and gaze, and as well were all found to relate to dominance.

In terms of expressiveness, males, but not females, were rated as more dominant when they were facially expressive (.26, -.36) respectively. In addition, Carney, Hall, and LeBeau found that more facial expressiveness was appropriate for those with more power and that these individuals were also more likely to have self-assured expressions. The eyes also have something to offer in terms of dominance. Dunbar and Burgoon found that higher visual dominance ratios were correlated with higher perceived dominance for males and females (.37, .28) respectively as rated by observers. Also, Carney, Hall, and LeBeau found that more glaring, more mutual gaze, longer gazing, and more looking while speaking would be more appropriate coming from an individual with more power.

Emotions are readily expressed by individuals making it easier to identify expressions of dominance. Hareli and  Shomrat  (2009) looked at various approach, neutral, and avoidance emotions. They ran two studies in order to understand perceptions of emotions as they related to dominance. Both studies asked participants to gauge levels of dominance. In study one, 208 individuals rated pictures of men and women with different emotions expressed.  In study two, 96 individuals watched a male technician fail at his job and then explain himself showing a neutral, angry or shameful expression. Emotions surveyed included approach emotions such as anger and happiness, neutral emotions and inhibitive or avoidance emotions such as shame, fear or sadness. Approach emotions are rated as the most dominant when compared to inhibitory emotions (Carney, Hall, and LeBeau, 2005; Hareli and Shomrat, 2009; Montepare and Dobish, 2003.)  In contrast, Montepare and Dobish (2003) found that happiness was perceived as more dominant than anger, while Hareli and Shomrat (2009) found the opposite. Females were perceived as more dominant than males when expressing happiness and males were perceived as slightly more dominant than females when expressing anger (Hareli and Shomrat, 2009). Hareli and Shomrat (2009) also found interesting results as it relates to neutral expressions. For instance, males were seen as significantly more dominant than females when expressing neutral expressions and neutral expressions were seen about as dominant as angry expressions for men, which is more dominant than inhibitory emotions. Inhibitory or avoidance emotions were seen as the least dominant (Carney, Hall, and LeBeau. 2005; Hareli and Shomrat, 2009; Montepare and Dobish, 2003). Sadness as opposed to fear was seen as the least dominant (Hareli and Shomrat, 2009; Montepare and Dobish, 2003).  Females expressing fear or sadness were seen as less dominant than males expressing the same emotion (Carney, Hall, and LeBeau. 2005; Hareli, Shomrat, 2009). Sadness and fear were also seen as more fitting for an individual with lower power (Carney, Hall, and LeBeau, 2005) Hareli and Shomrat (2009) found that shame tended to decrease perceptions of dominance more so than anger increases perceptions of dominance for males. For females anger was perceived as the most dominant emotion followed by happiness, then a  neutral expression, then fear and least dominant of all sadness. In comparison, anger was perceived as the most dominant expression for males, closely followed by a neutral expression, then happiness, then fear and least dominant of all sadness.

Furthermore, body control, posture, lean, and openness all were found to relate to dominance. For instance, Dunbar and Burgoon (2005) found that the more body control a woman had the more observers perceived her as dominant (.27) and that in general the most powerful are also the most facially expressive and the least controlled in their body. Carney, Hall, and LeBeau (2005) found high power individuals were perceived to lean forward, have open body positions, orient towards the other, and have an erect body posture more so than those of less power.

In addition, gestures also relate to dominance perceptions. Carney, Hall, and LeBeau (2005) found that high power individuals were more likely to use gestures, initiate more hand shaking and engage in a higher frequency of invasive touch. Dunbar and Burgoon (2005) found that observers rated only males as more dominant with increased use of illustrator gestures. The researchers also found that males perceived their partner to be less dominant when she used more adapter gestures.

In conclusion, one can see how dominance is a complex topic. Dominance relates to both power, status, and affiliation. Dominance is seen through manifest behaviors as indicated through the nonverbal and verbal indicators outlined above. Gender differences also exist within dominance perceptions though it depends on if one's work role or ones gender role is more salient.

Russel (as cited in Dunbar and Burgoon, 2005) stated that "the fundamental concept in social science is power, in the same way that energy is the fundamental concept in physics". It is true power and dominance are essential components in all of the world from cells to plants to reptiles, and humans that all have to fight for resources. As humans it is essential to use one's knowledge to make the world a more harmonious place using tools of assessment in order to understand individual and group behavior. This can be done through contemplating gender, social roles, and looking to verbal and non verbal indicators of dominance and submission to see how we as individuals relate to the world and each other. One can use this knowledge to one's advantage, for instance, if a boss is deciding between two individuals who are of relatively equal credentials. An individual could appear more competent by displaying dominant behaviors in reason which would could indicate confidence and the ability for leadership. A knowledge of dominant and submissive indicators could be used to help others in distress feel more equal in a relationship by monitoring one's own dominance displays and possibly by strategically using submissive displays.  Overall, it is essential to understand how dominance is manifested in relationships in order to understand how power and dominance influence us.

Gender differences
Gender variations exist because of differences in our expectations about what is appropriate for a particular gender (sex differences in psychology), what is appropriate depending on the composition of two or more people and whether gender or role norms are most salient. For instance, women who display dominance can be judged differently than men exhibiting the same behavior (Burgoon et al..; Carli and Winn, as cited by Youngquist, 2009). This is because women are perceived as less competitive and dominant than men and are thought to be less likely to display dominance (Burgoon et al., as cited by Youngquist, 2009); a woman who displays dominance might potentially be perceived as more dominant than a man displaying the same behavior because her behavior will be seen as unusual. Gender composition can influence dominant behaviors differently. For instance, individuals in a same-sex group can be perceived to be of equal status and are expected per norms to play fairly (Orcutt and Harvey, as cited by Youngquist, 2009). Gender differences in behavior are often found in mixed sex groups, though some have found that women can become more assertive with men in mixed group settings (Maccoby, as cited in Moskowitz, Suh, and Desaulniers, 1994).Therefore, dominance is more readily perceived when an individual displays a control act in a same sex group as opposed to a mixed sex group.

Mixed findings have occurred when one attempts to explain dominance displays by gender or role salience. Moskowitz, Suh, and Desaulniers (1994) believe this is because an individual in a lab has less role salience and more gender salience and therefore is inclined to use more gender stereotypical behaviors in the lab while an individual at work has more role salience and gender differences are thought to be reduced (Johnson, as cited in Moskowitz, Suh, and Desaulniers, 1994). Moskowitz, Suh and Desaulniers (1994) had individuals complete survey forms for 20 days over interactions with individuals at work that lasted over five minutes. Individuals completed an average of four forms a day. The forms were divided out across behavioral indicators to keep participants from selecting the same set of behaviors. The forms had equal amounts of behaviors assessing dominance, submission, agreeableness and combativeness. The researchers found that social roles determined agentic behavior at work, not gender roles. When looking at gender composition and communal behavior it was found that gender role, and not social role influenced communal behaviors. Men were indeed more quarrelsome than women in same sex groups, whereas women were more communal with one another. In addition to gender differences it is important to be able to identify and understand how verbal indicators relate to dominance.

See also
 Abusive power and control
 Control of time in power relationships
 Elite theory
 Personal boundaries
 Unmitigated communion
Dual strategies theory

References
Burgoon, J. K., and Hoobler, G. (2002). Nonverbal signals. In M. L. Knapp & J. A. Daly (Eds.), Handbook of interpersonal communication (3rd ed., pp. 240–299). Thousand Oaks, CA: Sage.
Carney, D. R., Hall, J. A., and LeBeau, L. S. (2005). Beliefs about the nonverbal expression of social power. Journal of Nonverbal Behavior, 29, 105-123. 
Dunbar, N. E., and Burgoon, J. K. (2005). Perceptions of power and interactional dominance in interpersonal relationships. Journal of Social and Personal Relationships, 22(2), 207-233. 
Hareli, S., and Shomrat, N. (2009). Emotional versus neutral expressions and perceptions of social dominance and submissiveness. Emotion, 9, 378-384. 
Lamb, T. A. (1981). Nonverbal and paraverbal control in dyads and triads: Sex or power differences? Social Psychology Quarterly, 44(1), 49–53.
Montepare, J. M., and Dobish, H. (2003). The contribution of emotion perceptions and their overgeneralizations to trait impressions. Journal of Nonverbal Behavior, 27, 236-254. 
Moskowitz, D. S., Suh, E. J., and Desaulniers, J. (1994). Situational influences on gender differences in agency and communion. Journal of Personality and Social Psychology, 66(4), 753-761. 
Tusing, K. J., and Dillard, J. P. (2000). The sounds of dominance. Human Communication Research, 26(1), 148-172. 
Youngquist, J. (2009). The effect of interruptions and dyad gender combination on perceptions of interpersonal dominance. Communication Studies, 60, 147-163.

Interpersonal relationships